Felekan (also Romanized as Felekān) is a village in Margavar Rural District, Silvaneh District, Urmia County, West Azerbaijan Province, Iran. At the 2006 census, its population was 590, in 108 families.

References 

Populated places in Urmia County